Paul Vaughan (born 23 April 1991) is a professional rugby league footballer who plays as  for the Warrington Wolves in the Betfred Super League. He has played for both Italy and Australia at international level.

He previously played for the St. George Illawarra Dragons and Canberra Raiders in the National Rugby League, and at representative level for NSW Country, NRL All Stars and New South Wales in the State of Origin series.

Background

Vaughan was born in Canberra, Australian Capital Territory, and is of German through father and Italian descent through his maternal grandmother.

He played his junior rugby league for the Gungahlin Bulls before being signed by the Canberra Raiders, with whom he played in the National Youth Competition in 2010 and 2011. In 2012, Vaughan graduated to the Raiders' New South Wales Cup team, the Mount Pritchard Mounties, winning the Mounties' Player's Player award and being named on the interchange bench in the 2012 NSW Cup Team of the Year.

Playing career

2013
On 18 April, Vaughan re-signed with the Raiders on a 2-year contract to the end of the 2015 season. In Round 7 of the 2013 NRL season, Vaughan made his NRL debut for the Canberra Raiders off the interchange bench against the North Queensland Cowboys in the Raiders 30-12 loss at 1300SMILES Stadium. In Round 14 against the Penrith Panthers, Vaughan scored his first NRL career try in the Raiders 24-12 win at Canberra Stadium. Vaughan finished the 2013 NRL season being named as the Raiders Rookie of the Year, playing in 18 matches and scoring a try in his debut year in the NRL. In October, Vaughan was named in the Italy 24-man squad for the 2013 World Cup, playing in all of their three matches.

2014
In Round 7 against the Melbourne Storm, Vaughan scored a solo effort try in the 79th minute to win the match for the Raiders 24-22 at Canberra Stadium. Vaughan earned selection in the NSW Country team in the City vs Country Origin match off the interchange, scoring a try in the 26-all draw in Dubbo. Vaughan finished the 2014 NRL season with him playing in 23 matches and scoring 7 tries for the Raiders. On 10 September, Vaughan re-signed with the Raiders until the end of the 2017 season.

2015
On 3 May, Vaughan played for New South Wales Country against New South Wales City in the 2015 City vs Country Origin match, playing off the interchange bench in Country's 34-22 win at Wagga Wagga. In Round 20 against the Penrith Panthers, he scored his first career double in the Raiders' 34-24 win at Penrith Stadium. He finished the 2015 season having played in all of the Raiders' 24 matches and scoring 4 tries. On 8 September, he was named in the 2015 Prime Minister's XIII squad but later pulled out due to injury.

2016
On 30 January, Vaughan was named in the Raiders' 2016 NRL Auckland Nines squad. On 8 May, for the third year in a row, Vaughan played for New South Wales Country against New South Wales City, where he played off the interchange bench in the 44-30 loss in Tamworth. After Round 18, Vaughan was dropped to the Raiders NSW Cup team the Mount Pritchard Mounties after Coach Ricky Stuart opted to select the newly arrived prop Junior Paulo from the Parramatta Eels, rising youngster Joseph Tapine and late bloomer rookie Clay Priest to be part of the forwards rotation. But after Clay Priest suffered a season ending ankle injury, Vaughan beat out overlooked veteran forwards Shaun Fensom and Jeff Lima to fill in the vacant spot on the interchange bench for the Finals. Vaughan finished the 2016 NRL season playing 20 matches and scoring 4 tries for the Canberra Raiders. On 15 October, it was announced that Vaughan signed a 3-year contract with the St. George Illawarra Dragons worth $1.75m, starting in 2017.

2017
On 10 February, Vaughan played for the World All Stars against the Indigenous All Stars in the 2017 All Stars match, playing off the interchange bench in the 34-8 loss at Hunter Stadium. In Round 1 of the 2017 NRL season, Vaughan made his club debut for the St George Illawarra Dragons against the Penrith Panthers, starting at prop in the 42-10 win at Jubilee Oval. In his next match, in Round 2 against the Parramatta Eels, Vaughan scored his first club try for the Dragons in the 34-16 loss at WIN Stadium. On 13 September, Vaughan was named in the 2017 Prime Minister's XIII squad.

2018
In 2018, Vaughan was named in The NSW Blues squad for The 2018 State of Origin series. Vaughan also had the honour of being the 1000th player to pull on a Blues jersey. On 5 June, Vaughan told the Sydney Morning Herald that "The best thing I did in my career was to leave Canberra and go to St George Illawarra." Vaughan went on to play in all 3 games of the 2018 State of Origin series as The Blues won the shield 2-1.

2019
After a good start to the 2019 NRL season, Vaughan was selected to play for New South Wales in the 2019 State of Origin series.  Vaughan played in all 3 games and scored a try in the deciding match which was played at ANZ Stadium. The Blues won 26-20 courtesy of a last minute try to James Tedesco. New South Wales would go on to win the series 2-1 and retain the shield for the first time since 2005.

Vaughan made a total of 23 appearances for St George Illawarra in the 2019 season as they endured one of their worst ever seasons, finishing 15th on the table above the last placed Gold Coast. St George Illawarra had gone into the season as one of the clubs expected to make the finals and challenge for the premiership.

On 30 September, Vaughan was named as prop in the Prime Minister's XIII side. On 7 October, Vaughan was named in the Australian side for the upcoming Oceania Cup fixtures.

2020
On 6 August, Vaughan was stood down by the club and fined $10,000 after he was caught breaking the NRL's strict bubble restrictions by visiting an Illawarra cafe.

Vaughan played 15 games for St. George Illawarra in the 2020 NRL season as the club finished 12th. Following the conclusion of the season, Vaughan was not selected for the 2020 State of Origin series.

2021
On 4 July, Vaughan was placed under investigation by the NRL after it was alleged he hosted a house party along with eleven of his teammates which went against the league's biosecurity protocols, as well as a breach of the NSW stay-at-home orders. The following day, Vaughan was suspended for eight matches and fined $50,000 over the incident. It was also alleged that Vaughan withheld information from the NRL and NSW Police. On 6 July, the St. George Illawarra board approved the termination of Vaughan's contract effective immediately. The illegal house party was one of three behavioural strikes against Vaughan.
On 28 July, Vaughan signed a contract with the Canterbury-Bankstown Bulldogs for the 2022 season.

2022
In round 1 of the 2022 NRL season, Vaughan made his club debut for Canterbury in their 6-4 victory against the North Queensland Toyota Cowboys at the Queensland Country Bank Stadium. Following the resignation of coach Trent Barrett, Vaughan was criticised by journalists for attacking the media despite explicit instructions from general manager Phil Gould not to speak to the media.
On 22 June, Vaughan signed a two-year deal to join English side Warrington starting in 2023. In round 20, Vaughan played his 200th first grade game in Canterbury's victory over Newcastle.

References

External links

St. George Illawarra Dragons profile
NRL profile
2017 RLWC profile

1991 births
Living people
Australia national rugby league team players
Australian people of German descent
Australian people of Italian descent
Sportspeople of Italian descent
Australian rugby league players
Australian expatriate sportspeople in England
Canberra Raiders players
Canterbury-Bankstown Bulldogs players
Country New South Wales Origin rugby league team players
Italy national rugby league team players
Italian expatriate sportspeople in England
Mount Pritchard Mounties players
New South Wales Rugby League State of Origin players
NRL All Stars players
Rugby league players from Canberra
Rugby league props
St. George Illawarra Dragons players
Warrington Wolves players